Almeda may refer to:

People 

Almeda C. Adams (1865 – 1949), American musician
 Almeda Riddle (1898 – 1986), American folk singer

Other 

Almeda, Houston, Texas
Almeda University, an unaccredited institution
"Almeda" (song), a 2019 song by Solange Knowles
Almeda (Barcelona Metro), a metro station in Cornellà de Llobregat
Almeda, Cornellà de Llobregat, a neighbourhood of Cornellà de Llobregat, in the metropolitan area of Barcelona
Almeda (album), a 2004 album by Cecil Taylor